"Hymn" is a 1982 song from Ultravox's sixth studio album Quartet. Released as the album's second single, it reached #11 on the UK Singles Chart and the Top 10 in Germany and Switzerland.

History 
The song was written by Warren Cann, Chris Cross, Billy Currie and Midge Ure and produced by George Martin. The cover art depicts certain symbols of Freemasonry, most notably the compass and the square.

The melody of the song was heavily inspired by The Zones' song "Mourning Star" (1977).

Lyrically, the song describes a time of corruption, in which "all that's good will fall from grace" and "Different words [...] have other meaning"; the protagonist expresses his worldly ambitions for "power and glory" in phrases from Bible ("the storybook"), especially The Lord's Prayer.

In line with this theme, the music video, directed by Ure and Cross, depicts a diabolical figure (played by Oliver Tobias) seducing men struggling in their fields (an actor, a politician, a musician and an office assistant, played by the four Ultravox members). After signing a contract, they all achieve success, though - as hinted at by the final scenes - at a cost.

Multiple synthesizers are listed in the creation of the track, including the PPG Wave, Minimoog, ARP Odyssey, E-mu Emulator, and Yamaha CS-80.

Track listing

7" version 
 "Hymn" [single edit] – 4:24 
 "Monument" – 3:16

12" version 
 "Hymn" – 5:46
 "Monument" – 3:16
 "The Thin Wall  (live 17 Oct 81 at Hammersmith Odeon)" – 5:54

Covers 

The song has been covered by numerous acts including Cabballero (1994), Cosmo (1994), German electro project Music Instructor (1995), Supporters (1997), The Stunned Guys (1998), Edguy (1998), DJ Jaxx (2000), 4 Clubbers (2002) Gigi D'Agostino (2003), Lunatica (2004), Tina Cousins (2004), Polish DJ Psychophaze (2005), Mägo de Oz (under the name "Mañana empieza hoy") (2005), Raz Ohara (2005), Age Pee (2006), Trancemission (2006), Parasytic (2008), PROXIMITY (2010), Kirlian Camera (2011), Mägo de Oz again (2013), Marnik & Danko (2018) and Gigi D'Agostino again (2020)

References

External links 
 Ultravox - Hymn (7", Single)
 Ultravox - Hymn Hymn (12")

1983 singles
1982 singles
1982 songs
Ultravox songs
Songs written by Midge Ure
Song recordings produced by George Martin
Songs written by Warren Cann
Songs written by Chris Cross
Songs written by Billy Currie
Chrysalis Records singles